Dongkuk Steel Mill Co, Ltd. is a steel company with its headquarters in the city of Seoul, South Korea. Founded on 7 July 1951, its manufacturing plants are located in Pohang, Incheon, Dangjin  and Busan. Its main products are steel plates mainly for shipbuilding, beams, sections and bars mainly for construction. Dongkuk Steel is the parent company of the Dongkuk Steel Group with several subsidiaries including Union Steel.  Dongkuk Steel Mill is the second largest EAF steel producer in Korea behind Hyundai Steel. Dongkuk Steel mill is the world's forty-ninth largest steel maker among IISI member companies (2009).  The current chairman is Mr. Sae Joo Chang.  The company is a member of the Dongkuk Steel Group.

Competitors 
 Hyundai Steel (the new name of Hyundai INI Steel)
 POSCO
 Korea Iron & Steel Co., Ltd.
 Hyundai Hysco
 BNG Steel
 Dongbu Steel
 Sinhwa Steel
SeAH Steel

External links 
 Dongkuk Steel Korean website
 Dongkuk Steel English website

Steel companies of South Korea
Manufacturing companies based in Seoul
Chaebol